Colonel Mohammed Rayyan (died 1986), nicknamed "Sky Falcon," was a fighter pilot with the Iraqi Air Force during the Iran–Iraq War. He scored 5 air combat kills. He was the most successful MiG-25 pilot. 

Rayyan, while only a Flight Lieutenant and flying a MiG-21MF, claimed two (later confirmed) kills against Iranian F-5 Freedom Fighters in 1980. Later a Captain, he qualified on the MiG-25P in 1981 and claimed 5 more victories (3 verified by western sources.) Most of his victories were F-4 Phantoms. Having flown the MiG-25 was evidence of his considerable skill, as Soviet "advisers" were stationed in Iraq specifically to limit access to this advanced jet, and only the best pilots flew them.

In 1986, having attained the rank of colonel, Rayyan was shot down and killed by IRIAF Grumman F-14 Tomcats.

See also
Jalil Zandi
Hossein Khalatbari

References 

1955 births
1986 deaths
Iraqi Air Force officers
Iraqi flying aces
Iran–Iraq War flying aces
Iraqi military personnel of the Iran–Iraq War
Aviators killed by being shot down